The Cascue is a right tributary of the river Dâmbovița in Romania. Its source is near the Păpușa Peak, in the Iezer Mountains.

References

Rivers of Romania
Rivers of Argeș County